Signal-induced proliferation-associated protein 1 is a protein that in humans is encoded by the SIPA1 gene.

The product of this gene is a mitogen induced GTPase activating protein (GAP). It exhibits a specific GAP activity for Ras-related regulatory proteins Rap1 and Rap2, but not for Ran or other small GTPases. This protein may also hamper mitogen-induced cell cycle progression when abnormally or prematurely expressed. It is localized to the perinuclear region. Two alternatively spliced variants encoding the same isoform have been characterized to date.

References

Further reading